Wesley Cotton (born 9 June 1977) is an English former professional rugby league footballer.

Background
Cotton was born in Wigan, Greater Manchester, England.

Career
Cotton started his career playing for the Wigan Warriors, and then joined the London Broncos.

References

1977 births
Living people
English rugby league players
Rugby league players from Wigan
London Broncos players
Rugby league five-eighths